The Academy of Canadian Cinema and Television presents an annual award for Best Achievement in Cinematography, to honour the best Canadian film cinematography.

The award was first presented in 1963 as part of the Canadian Film Awards, with separate categories for colour and black-and-white cinematography; the separate categories were discontinued after 1969, with only a single category presented through the 1970s. After 1978, the award was presented as part of the new Genie Awards; since 2012, it has been presented as part of the Canadian Screen Awards. In early years, the award could be presented for either narrative feature or documentary films, although this was discontinued later on and only feature films were eligible. Beginning with the 3rd Canadian Screen Awards, a separate category was introduced for Best Cinematography in a Documentary.

1960s

1970s

1980s

1990s

2000s

2010s

2020s

See also
Prix Iris for Best Cinematography

References

 
Awards for best cinematography
Cinematography